Holmstad is a village in Sortland Municipality in Nordland county, Norway. Indre Eidsfjord Church is located in this village.

References

Sortland
Villages in Nordland
Populated places of Arctic Norway
Populated coastal places in Norway